WPWT (870 AM) is a classic country music formatted broadcast radio station licensed to Colonial Heights, Tennessee, serving the Tri-Cities, VA/TN area.  WPWT is owned and operated by Kenneth Clyde Hill.

History 
This station signed on the air in 1984. Prior to its sign-on, it had been assigned the call letters WIKV by the FCC. Since these calls were deemed by constructing supervisor Dave Murray (husband of Martha Murray, the original licensee) to be too close to the calls of a prominent FM in the market, WIKQ, the calls were changed, to WPRQ. All this transpired before the station ever officially hit the air.

The original power was 5,000 watts. This was increased later to 10,000 watts. The signal, which shares the clear channel of 870 kHz with Class-A 50,000-watt WWL in New Orleans, was licensed as daytime-only, which it remains today.

The original format was contemporary Christian hit music. Other formats have followed, including news/talk and religious talk. In the late 1980s/early 1990s, the station was dark (silent) for a time, but was sold and returned to the air. Its current owner, Kenneth Clyde Hill, owns other stations as well.

The transmitter was originally a single tower near Warrior's Path State Park in Colonial Heights, Tennessee, which is south of Kingsport, Tennessee. It remains there today.

The original studio was in a residence, in Colonial Heights, Tennessee, which was owned by Dave and Martha Murray.

In November 2017, WPWT rebranded as "96.3 The Possum" (simulcasting on FM translators W242CQ 96.3 Colonial Heights and W264BY 100.7 Kingsport).

Management
Dr. Kenneth C. Hill is the owner of WPWT and sister stations WHCB and WHGG.

Previous logo

References

External links
96.3 The Possum Online

PWT
Classic country radio stations in the United States
Radio stations established in 1984
1984 establishments in Tennessee
PWT